The Loggia Palace is a Venetian Gothic palace in Koper, a port town in southwestern Slovenia. It is the only preserved Gothic town hall in Slovenia.

History
The earliest part of the existing building dates from 1462, when building work began on a replacement for an earlier Loggia that had stood in the same position on the north side of the main square of Koper, opposite the Praetorian Palace.

Following a plague outbreak in Koper in 1553-1555, the facade of the Loggia was embellished with coats-of-arms, and a terracotta statue of the Madonna and Child was erected in a niche above the left corner column.

Further work was carried out in 1698, when a second storey was added and the facade was extended with two additional arches taken from the west side of the palace.

The Loggia currently houses a cafe on the ground floor. In the second floor, it houses an art gallery operated by the Piran Coastal Galleries.

References

Buildings and structures completed in 1462
Houses completed in 1698
Palaces and mansions in Koper
Gothic palaces
Gothic architecture in Slovenia
City and town halls in Slovenia
Loggias